Korito is a village in the municipality of Gostivar, North Macedonia.

Demographics
As of the 2021 census, Korito had 57 residents with the following ethnic composition:
Albanians 54
Persons for whom data are taken from administrative sources 3

According to the 2002 census, the village had a total of 675 inhabitants. Ethnic groups in the village include:

Albanians 673
Others 2

References

External links

Villages in Gostivar Municipality
Albanian communities in North Macedonia